Jet Car Stunts is a 2014 video game developed by Grip Games and published by BitComposer Entertainment. It is a remake of the 2009 iOS game of the same name.

Development 
The game was in development for almost a year. It was announced in April 2014 for multiple platforms including Windows, Xbox 360 and PlayStation platforms. Developers decided not to make a port of the mobile game but instead to produce a proper remake. Grip Games implemented many improvements, including redone graphics, some changes to the car lineup, physics updates, and additional modes. An Xbox One version was released on March 13, 2015.

Gameplay 
The game has the same gameplay as the original Jet Car Stunts. It is a hybrid between a racing and a platform game. Player controls a Jet Car, a combination of a race car and a jet plane, to get through platform tracks, performing stunt tricks along the way. It also features new cars, 36 testing tracks, three game modes, HD graphics, damage modelling and asynchronous multiplayer.

Reception 
The game received mixed to negative reviews, with Metacritic reporting a weighted average score of 52 out of 100 based on 9 reviews, indicating "mixed or average reviews".

References

External links 
 

2014 video games
Racing video games
Video game remakes
Video games developed in the Czech Republic
Windows games
MacOS games
PlayStation 3 games
PlayStation 4 games
PlayStation Network games
PlayStation Vita games
Xbox 360 Live Arcade games
Xbox One games
Grip Digital games
Multiplayer and single-player video games
BitComposer Interactive games